Cambridge Township is an inactive township in Saline County, in the U.S. state of Missouri.

Cambridge Township was erected in 1871, taking its name from the community of Cambridge, Missouri.

References

Townships in Missouri
Townships in Saline County, Missouri